The Oakland Athletics all–time roster is a list of people who have played at least one game for the Oakland Athletics, Kansas City Athletics, or Philadelphia Athletics baseball teams of the American League, along with their primary position and years played for the team. It does not include players for the 1871–76 Philadelphia Athletics, the 1882–1890 Philadelphia Athletics, or the 1891 Philadelphia Athletics. The only Athletics player with no regular season appearances is Mark Kiger who only played for Oakland during two games in the 2006 American League Championship Series.

Names in bold are members of the National Baseball Hall of Fame and Museum.



A

 Andy Abad, IF, 2001
 Fernando Abad, P, 2014-15
 Glenn Abbott, P, 1973–76
 Kurt Abbott, IF, 1993, 1998
 Al Aber, P, 1957
 Tal Abernathy, P, 1942–44
 Jeremy Accardo, P, 2012
 Domingo Acevedo, P, 2021-
 Merito Acosta, OF, 1918
 Mark Acre, P, 1994–97
 Dick Adams, IF, 1947
 Mike Adams, OF, 1978
 Willie Adams, P, 1918–19
 Willie Adams, P, 1996–97
 Dick Adkins, IF, 1942
 Troy Afenir, C, 1990–91
 Jack Aker, P, 1964–68
 Darrel Akerfelds, P, 1986
 Arismendy Alcantara, 2B, 2016
 Raul Alcantara, P, 2016-17
 Mike Aldrete, OF, 1993–95
 R.J. Alvarez, P, 2015
 Gary Alexander, C, 1978
 Matt Alexander, OF, 1975–77
 Austin Allen, C, 2020-2022
 Bob Allen, OF, 1919
 Brandon Allen, IF, 2011–12
 Dick Allen, IF, 1977
 Nick Allen, SS, 2022
 Dana Allison, P, 1991
 Bill Almon, IF, 1983–84
 Yonder Alonso, 1B, 2016-17
 Felipe Alou, OF, 1970–71
 Jesús Alou, OF, 1973–74
 Matty Alou, OF, 1972
 Dell Alston, OF, 1978
 George Alusik, OF, 1962–64
 Brant Alyea, OF, 1972
 Wayne Ambler, IF, 1937–39
 Walter Ancker, P, 1915
 Brett Anderson, P, 2009–13, 2018-19
 Bryan Anderson, C, 2014-15
 Dwain Anderson, IF, 1971–72
 Tanner Anderson, P, 2019
 Walter Anderson, P, 1917–19
 Elbert Andrews, P, 1925
 Mike Andrews, IF, 1973
 Elvis Andrus, SS, 2021-22
 Joaquín Andújar, P, 1986–87
 Kevin Appier, P, 1999–2000
 Fred Applegate, P, 1904
 Fred Archer, P, 1936–37
 Jim Archer, P, 1961–62
 Marcos Armas, IF, 1993
 Tony Armas, OF, 1977–82
 Harry Armbruster, OF, 1906
 George Armstrong, C, 1946
 Howard Armstrong, P, 1911
 Larry Arndt, IF, 1989
 Orie Arntzen, P, 1943
 Fernando Arroyo, P, 1982–86
 Joe Astroth, C, 1945–56
 Keith Atherton, P, 1983–86
 Tommy Atkins, P, 1909–10
 John Axford, P, 2016-17
 Joe Azcue, C, 1962–63

B

 Loren Babe, IF, 1953
 Johnny Babich, P, 1940–41
 Shooty Babitt, IF, 1981
 Eddie Bacon, P, 1917
 Bill Bagwell, OF, 1925
 Stan Bahnsen, P, 1975–77
 Andrew Bailey, P, 2009–12
 Gene Bailey, OF, 1917
 Homer Bailey, P, 2019
 Harold Baines,  DH, 1990–92
 Doug Bair, P, 1977, 1986
 Jeff Baisley, IF, 2008
 Bock Baker, P, 1901
 Dusty Baker, OF, 1985–86
 Frank Baker, IF, 1908–14
 Neal Baker, P, 1927
 Scott Baker, P, 1995
 Steve Baker, P, 1982–83
 Grant Balfour, P, 2011–13
 Chris Bando, C, 1989
 Sal Bando, IF, 1966–76
 Everett Bankston, OF, 1915
 Wes Bankston, IF, 2008
 Dave Barbee, OF, 1926
 Babe Barna, OF, 1937–38
 Scotty Barr, OF, 1908–09
 Luis Barrera, OF, 2021-
 Franklin Barreto, 2B, 2017-20
 Bill Barrett, OF, 1921
 Dick Barrett, P, 1933
 Hardin Barry, P, 1912
 Jack Barry, IF, 1908–15
 John Barthold, P, 1904
 Bill Bartley, P, 1906–07
 Irv Bartling, IF, 1938
 Daric Barton, IF, 2007–14
 Harry Barton, C, 1905
 Chris Bassitt, P, 2015-16, 2018-21
 Norm Bass, P, 1961–63
 Charlie Bates, OF, 1927
 Ray Bates, IF, 1917
 Bill Bathe, C, 1986
 Tony Batista, IF, 1996–97
 Allen Battle, OF, 1996
 Chris Batton, P, 1976
 Lou Bauer, P, 1918
 Hank Bauer, OF, 1960–61
 Stan Baumgartner, P, 1924–26
 Mike Baxes, IF, 1956–58
 Don Baylor, DH, 1976, 1988
 Billy Beane, OF, 1989
 Dave Beard, P, 1980–83
 Rich Becker, OF, 1999–2000
 Bill Beckmann, P, 1939–42
 Cam Bedrosian, P, 2021
 Todd Belitz, P, 2000–01
 Kevin Bell, IF, 1982
 Zeke Bella, OF, 1959
 Mark Bellhorn, IF, 1997–98, 2000–01
 Chief Bender, P, 1903–14
 Vern Benson, IF, 1943–46
 Al Benton, P, 1934–35
 Johnny Berger, C, 1922
 Tony Bernazard, IF, 1987
 Bill Bernhard, P, 1901, 1902
 Gerónimo Berroa, DH, 1994–97
 Charlie Berry, C, 1925, 1934–38
 Claude Berry, C, 1906–07
 Joe Berry, P, 1944–46
 Reno Bertoia, IF, 1961
 Herman Besse, P, 1940–46
 Jeff Bettendorf, P, 1984
 Christian Bethancourt, 1B, 2022
 Hal Bevan, IF, 1952, 1955
 Hank Biasatti, IF, 1949
 Lyle Bigbee, P, 1920
 Bruce Billings, P, 2011
 George Binks, OF, 1947–48
 Tim Birtsas, P, 1985–86
 Bill Bishop, P, 1921
 Charlie Bishop, P, 1952–55
 Max Bishop, IF, 1924–33
 Joe Bitker, P, 1990
 Don Black, P, 1943–45
 Paul Blackburn, P,2017-
 Travis Blackley, P, 2012
 Ewell Blackwell, P, 1955
 George Blaeholder, P, 1935
 Buddy Blair, IF, 1942
 Carson Blair, C, 2015
 Ed Blake, P, 1957
 Johnny Blanchard, OF, 1965
 Gil Blanco, P, 1966
 Kyle Blanks, OF/1B, 2014
 Lance Blankenship, OF, 1988–93
 Joe Blanton, P, 2004–08
 Don Blasingame, IF, 1966
 Curt Blefary, OF, 1971–72
 Jeremy Bleich, P, 2018
 Ray Blemker, P, 1960
 Jerry Blevins, P, 2007–13
 Mike Blowers, IF, 1998
 Bert Blue, C, 1908
 Vida Blue, P, 1969–77
 Chet Boak, IF, 1960
 Charlie Boardman, P, 1913–14
 Hiram Bocachica, OF, 2005–07
 Bruce Bochte, IF, 1984–86
 Ping Bodie, OF, 1917
 Joe Boever, P, 1993
 Warren Bogle, P, 1968
 Pat Bohen, P, 1913
 Joe Boley, IF, 1927–32
 Don Bollweg, IF, 1954–55
 Skye Bolt, OF, 2019, 2021-
 Frank Bonner, IF, 1902
 Boof Bonser, P, 2010
 Dan Boone, P, 1919
 Ray Boone, IF, 1959
 Rich Bordi, P, 1980–81, 1988
 Mike Bordick, IF, 1990–96
 Rick Bosetti, OF, 1981–82
 Dick Bosman, P, 1975–76
 Henry Bostick, IF, 1915
 Rafael Bournigal, IF, 1996–98
 Pat Bourque, IF, 1973–74
 Rob Bowen, C, 2007–08
 Cedrick Bowers, P, 2010
 Jim Bowie, IF, 1994
 Micah Bowie, P, 2002–03
 Charlie Bowles, P, 1943–45
 Weldon Bowlin, IF, 1967
 Joe Bowman, P, 1932
 Ted Bowsfield, P, 1963–64
 Bob Boyd, IF, 1961
 Clete Boyer, IF, 1955–57
 Cloyd Boyer, P, 1955
 Dallas Braden, P, 2007–11
 Bill Bradford, P, 1956
 Chad Bradford, P, 2001–05
 Bert Bradley, P, 1983
 Milton Bradley, OF, 2006–07
 Dallas Bradshaw, IF, 1917
 Al Brancato, IF, 1939–45
 Dud Branom, IF, 1927
 Marshall Brant, IF, 1983
 Frank Brazill, IF, 1921–22
 Michael Brady, P, 2017
 Bill Breckinridge, P, 1929
 Craig Breslow, P, 2009–11
 Rube Bressler, OF, 1914–16
 Billy Brewer, P, 1997
 George Brickley, OF, 1913
 Jonah Bride, 2B, 2022-
 John Briggs, P, 1960
 John Briscoe, P, 1991–96
 Lou Brissie, P, 1947–51
 Tilson Brito, IF, 1997
 Pete Broberg, P, 1978
 Aaron Brooks, P, 2015, 2018-19
 Bobby Brooks, OF, 1969–72
 Scott Brosius, IF, 1991–97
 Art Brouthers, IF, 1906
 Andrew Brown, P, 2007–08
 Boardwalk Brown, P, 1911–14
 Darrell Brown, OF, 1982
 Emil Brown, OF, 2008
 Jeremy Brown, C, 2006
 Jim Brown, OF, 1916
 Larry Brown, IF, 1971–72
 Norm Brown, P, 1943–46
 Ollie Brown, OF, 1972
 Seth Brown, OF, 2019-
 Jerry Browne, IF, 1992–93
 Lou Bruce, OF, 1904
 Earle Brucker Sr., C, 1937–40, 1943
 Earle Brucker Jr., C, 1948
 Frank Bruggy, C, 1922–24
 Jaycob Brugman, OF, 2017
 Mike Brumley, IF, 1994
 George Brunet, P, 1956–60
 Will Brunson, P, 1999–2000
 Billy Bryan, C, 1961–66
 Derek Bryant, OF, 1979
 Ryan Buchter, P, 2018-19
 Travis Buck, OF, 2007–10
 Mark Budaska, DH, 1978–81
 Red Bullock, P, 1936
 Tom Burgmeier, P, 1983–84
 Bill Burgo, OF, 1943–44
 Glenn Burke, OF, 1978–79
 Wally Burnette, P, 1956–58
 Billy Burns, OF, 2014-16
 Dennis Burns, P, 1923–24
 George Burns, IF, 1918–20, 1929
 Joe Burns, IF, 1944–45
 Todd Burns, P, 1988–91
 Ray Burris, P, 1984
 Jeff Burroughs, OF, 1982–84
 John Burrows, P, 1943
 Dick Burrus, IF, 1919–20
 Moe Burtschy, P, 1950–56
 Ed Busch, IF, 1943–45
 Don Buschhorn, P, 1965
 Joe Bush, P, 1912–17, 1928
 Billy Butler, 1B, 2015-16
 Ralph Buxton, P, 1938
 Freddie Bynum, OF, 2005
 Harry Byrd, P, 1950–53
 Eric Byrnes, OF, 2000–05
 Jim Byrnes, C, 1906

C

 Orlando Cabrera, SS, 2009
 Greg Cadaret, P, 1987–89
 Trevor Cahill, P, 2009–11, 2018
 Sugar Cain, P, 1932–35
 Kiko Calero, P, 2005–08
 Fred Caligiuri, P, 1941–42
 Ben Callahan, P, 1983
 John Callahan, C, 1903
 Alberto Callaspo, IF, 2013–14
 Frank Callaway, IF, 1921–22
 Ernie Camacho, P, 1980
 Kevin Cameron, P, 2009
 Bert Campaneris, IF, 1964–76
 Kevin Campbell, P, 1991–93
 Tom Candiotti, P, 1998–99
 Mark Canha, OF, 2015-21
 José Canseco, OF, 1985–92, 1997
 Ozzie Canseco, OF, 1990
 Guy Cantrell, P, 1927
 Conner Capel, OF, 2022-
 Andy Carey, IF, 1960–1961
 Andrew Carignan, P, 2011–12
 Charlie Carr, IF, 1901
 Chico Carrasquel, IF, 1958
 Doc Carroll, C, 1916
 Tom Carroll, IF, 1959
 Matt Carson, OF, 2009–10
 Chris Carter, 1B/OF, 2010–12
 Nick Carter, P, 1908
 Sol Carter, P, 1931
 Rico Carty, OF, 1973, 1978
 Joe Cascarella, P, 1934, 1935
 Santiago Casilla, P, 2004–09, 2017-18
 Ryan Castellani, P, 2022-
 George Caster, P, 1934–40
 Jim Castiglia, C, 1942
 Alberto Castillo, C, 2005
 Angel Castro, P, 2015
 Luis Castro, IF, 1902
 Ramón Castro, IF, 2004
 Simon Castro, P, 2017
 Danny Cater, IF, 1966–69
 Bill Caudill, P, 1984, 1987
 Jake Caulfield, IF, 1946
 Wayne Causey, IF, 1961–66
 Art Ceccarelli, P, 1955–56
Orlando Cepeda, IF, 1972
 Bob Cerv, OF, 1957–60
 Yoenis Céspedes, OF, 2012–14
 Ron Cey, IF, 1987
 Andrew Chafin, P, 2021
 Dave Chalk, IF, 1979
 Charlie Chant, OF, 1975
 Fred Chapman, IF, 1939–41
 John Chapman, IF, 1924
 Matt Chapman, IF, 2017-2021
 Sam Chapman, OF, 1938–51
 Ed Charles, IF, 1962–67
 Ossie Chavarria, IF, 1966–67
 Eric Chavez, IF, 1998–2010
 Jesse Chavez, P, 2012–15
 Harry Chiti, C, 1958–60
 Steve Chitren, P, 1990–91
 Michael Choice, OF, 2013
 Bobby Chouinard, P, 1996
 Ryan Christenson, OF, 1998–2001
 Russ Christopher, P, 1942–47
 Darryl Cias, C, 1983
 Joe Cicero, OF, 1945
 Ed Cihocki, IF, 1932–33
 Gino Cimoli, OF, 1962–64
 Lou Ciola, P, 1943
 Frank Cipriani, OF, 1961
 Bill Cissell, IF, 1937
 Allie Clark, OF, 1951–53
 Doug Clark, OF, 2006
 Jermaine Clark, OF, 2005
 Ron Clark, IF, 1971–72
 Terry Clark, P, 1998–99
 Gowell Claset, P, 1933
 Ernie Clement, 3B, 2022-
 Lou Clinton, OF, 1965
 Tyler Clippard, P, 2015
 Tom Clyde, P, 1943
 Andy Coakley, P, 1902–06
 Ty Cobb, OF, 1927–28
 Mickey Cochrane, C, 1925–33
 Chris Codiroli, P, 1982–87
 Chris Coghlan, 2B, 2016
 Mike Colangelo, OF, 2002
 Rocky Colavito, OF, 1964
 Nate Colbert, IF, 1976
 Ed Coleman, OF, 1932–35
 Joe Coleman, P, 1942–53
 Joe Coleman, P, 1977–78
 Ray Coleman, OF, 1948
 Rip Coleman, P, 1957, 1959
 Allan Collamore, P, 1911
 Dave Collins, OF, 1985
 Eddie Collins, IF, 1906–14, 1927–30
 Eddie Collins, OF, 1939–42
 Jimmy Collins, IF, 1907–08
 Zip Collins, OF, 1921
 Bartolo Colón, P, 2012–13
 Bob Cone, P, 1915
 Billy Conigliaro, OF, 1973
 Bill Connelly, P, 1945
 Steve Connelly, P, 1998
 Brooks Conrad, IF, 2008
 Bill Conroy, C, 1935–37
 Tim Conroy, P, 1978–85
 Billy Consolo, IF, 1962
 Owen Conway, IF, 1915
 Ryan Cook, P, 2012–15
 Bobby Coombs, P, 1933
 Jack Coombs, P, 1906–14
 Pat Cooper, P, 1946–47
 Rocky Coppinger, P, 2001–02
 Art Corcoran, IF, 1915
 Jim Corsi, P, 1988–89, 1992, 1995–96
 Ray Cosey, PH, 1980
 Jharel Cotton, P, 2016-17
 Ensign Cottrell, P, 1913
 Marlan Coughtry, IF, 1962
 Danny Coulombe, P, 2015-18
 Clint Courtney, C, 1961
 Stan Coveleski, P, 1912
 Wes Covington, OF, 1961
 Collin Cowgill, OF, 2012
 Glenn Cox, P, 1955–58
 Jeff Cox, IF, 1980–81
 Toots Coyne, IF, 1914
 Roy Crabb, P, 1912
 Walt Craddock, P, 1955–58
 George Craig, P, 1907
 Bobby Cramer, P, 2010–11
 Doc Cramer, OF, 1929–35
 Sam Crane, IF, 1914–16
 Willie Crawford, OF, 1977
 Jack Crimian, P, 1956
 Coco Crisp, OF, 2010–16
 Jim Cronin, IF, 1929
 Bobby Crosby, IF, 2003–09
 Lave Cross, IF, 1901–05
 Monte Cross, IF, 1902–07
 Cap Crowell, P, 1915–16
 Woody Crowson, P, 1945
 Press Cruthers, IF, 1913–14
 Fausto Cruz, IF, 1994–95
 Juan Cruz, P, 2005–06
 Tim Cullen, IF, 1972
 Dick Culler, IF, 1936
 Aaron Cunningham, OF, 2008–09
 Mike Cunningham, P, 1906
 Jim Curry, IF, 1909
 Jack Cust, OF, 2007–10
 Tyler Cyr, P, 2022-

D

 John D'Acquisto, P, 1982
 Carl Dale, P, 1999
 Bud Daley, P, 1958–61
 Pete Daley, C, 1960
 Tom Daley, OF, 1913–14
 Bert Daly, IF, 1903
 Johnny Damon, OF, 2001
 Harry Damrau, IF, 1915
 Art Daney, P, 1928
 Dave Danforth, P, 1911–12
 Buck Danner, IF, 1915
 Ron Darling, P, 1991–95
 Vic Davalillo, OF, 1973–74
 Jeff DaVanon, OF, 2007
 Claude Davidson, IF, 1918
 Matt Davidson, 3B, 2022
 Chick Davies, P, 1914–15
 Bob Davis, P, 1958–60
 Bud Davis, P, 1915
 Crash Davis, IF, 1940–42
 Harry Davis, IF, 1901–11, 1913–17
 Ike Davis, 1B, 2015
 Khris Davis, OF, DH, 2016-2020, 2021
 Mike Davis, OF, 1980–87
 Rajai Davis, OF, 2008–10, 2017
 Storm Davis, P, 1987–89, 1993
 Tod Davis, IF, 1949–51
 Tommy Davis, OF, 1970–71
 Bill Dawley, P, 1989
 Fautino de los Santos, P, 2011–12
 Chubby Dean, P, 1936–41
 Jaff Decker, OF, 2017
 David DeJesus, OF, 2011
 Bobby Del Greco, OF, 1961–63
 Jim Delsing, OF, 1960
 Joe DeMaestri, IF, 1953–59
 Billy DeMars, IF, 1948
 Chris Denorfia, OF, 2008–09
 Claud Derrick, IF, 1910–12
 Russ Derry, OF, 1946
 Gene Desautels, C, 1946
 Jimmie DeShong, P, 1932
 Ross Detwiler, P, 2016
 Jordan Díaz, 2B, 2022-
 Jim Dickson, P, 1965–66
 Murry Dickson, P, 1958–59
 Bill Dietrich, P, 1933–36, 1947–48
 Jake Diekman, P, 2019-21
 Bob Dillinger, IF, 1950
 Miguel Diloné, OF, 1978–79
 Lenny DiNardo, P, 2007–08
 Art Ditmar, P, 1954–56, 1961–62
 Moxie Divis, OF, 1916
 Sonny Dixon, P, 1954–55
 Chuck Dobson, P, 1966–73
 Joe Dolan, IF, 1901
 Pat Donahue, C, 1910
 John Donaldson, IF, 1966–74
 Josh Donaldson, IF/C, 2010–14
 Sean Doolittle, P, 2012–17
 Octavio Dotel, P, 2004–05
 Felix Doubront, P, 2015
 Jim Dougherty, P, 1998
 Snooks Dowd, IF, 1919
 Al Downing, P, 1970
 Kelly Downs, P, 1992–93
 Brian Doyle, IF, 1981
 Carl Doyle, P, 1935–36
 Tom Dozier, P, 1986
 Moe Drabowsky, P, 1962–65
 Larry Drake, OF, 1945
 Kirk Dressendorfer, P, 1991
 Stephen Drew, IF, 2012
 Jim Driscoll, IF, 1970
 Michael Driscoll, P, 1916
 Keith Drumright, IF, 1981
 Justin Duchscherer, P, 2003–10
 Jim Duckworth, P, 1966
 Joe Dugan, IF, 1917–21
 Bill Duggleby, P, 1902
 Bob Duliba, P, 1967
 Ryan Dull, P, 2015-19
 Dave Duncan, C, 1964–72
 Taylor Duncan, IF, 1978
 Adam Dunn, DH, 2014
 Steve Dunning, P, 1977
 Erubiel Durazo, DH, 2003–05
 Ryne Duren, P, 1957
 Ray Durham, IF, 2002
 Carl Duser, P, 1956–58
 Jermaine Dye, OF, 2001–04
 Jimmy Dygert, P, 1905–10
 Jimmy Dykes, IF, 1918–32

E

 George Earnshaw, P, 1928–33
 Paul Easterling, OF, 1938
 Vallie Eaves, P, 1935
 Harry Eccles, P, 1915
 Dennis Eckersley, P, 1987–95
 Charlie Eckert, P, 1919–22
 Chris Eddy, P, 1995
 Bill Edgerton, P, 1966–67
 Doc Edwards, C, 1963–65
 Mike Edwards, 2B, 1978–80
 Mike Edwards, IF/OF, 2003
 Ralph Edwards, IF, 1915
 Ben Egan, C, 1908–12
 Howard Ehmke, P, 1926–30
 Brett Eibner, OF, 2016
 Randy Elliott, OF, 1980
 Dock Ellis, P, 1977
 Mark Ellis, IF, 2002–03, 2005–11
 Bones Ely, IF, 1901
 Alan Embree, P, 2007–08
 Chester Emerson, OF, 1911–12
 Charlie Engle, IF, 1925–26
 Hal Epps, OF, 1944
 Mike Epstein, IF, 1971–72
 Larry Eschen, IF, 1942
 Sammy Esposito, IF, 1963
 Chuck Essegian, OF, 1961, 1963
 Jim Essian, C, 1978–80, 1984
 Bobby Estalella, OF, 1943–45, 1949
 Marco Estrada, P, 2019
 Seth Etherton, P, 2004–05
 Nick Etten, IF, 1938–39
 Dana Eveland, P, 2008–09
 Tommy Everidge, 1B, 2009
 Art Ewoldt, IF, 1919

F

 Everett Fagan, P, 1943–46
 Frank Fahey, OF, 1918
 Howard Fahey, IF, 1912
 Ferris Fain, IF, 1947–52
 Jim Fairbank, P, 1903–04
 Ron Fairly, IF, 1976
 Cy Falkenberg, P, 1917
 Jeurys Familia, P, 2018
 Frank Fanovich, P, 1953
 Ed Farmer, P, 1983
 Sal Fasano, C, 2000–01
 Ernie Fazio, IF, 1966
 Michael Feliz, P, 2021
 Ramón Fermín, P, 1995
 Frank Fernández, C, 1970–71
 Bill Ferrazzi, P, 1935
 Tom Ferrick, P, 1941
 Mike Fetters, P, 1998
 Willy Fetzer, PH, 1906
 Mike Fiers, P, 2018-21
 Ed Figueroa, P, 1981
 Pedro Figueroa, P, 2012–13
 Jeremy Fikac, P, 2003
 Eddie Files, P, 1908
 Dana Fillingim, P, 1915
 Rollie Fingers, P, 1968–76
 Jim Finigan, IF, 1954–56
 Herman Fink, P, 1935–37
 Lou Finney, OF, 1931–39
 Bill Fischer, P, 1961–63
 Jack Flater, P, 1908
 Paul Fletcher, P, 1996
 Elmer Flick, OF, 1902
 Lew Flick, OF, 1943–44
 Mort Flohr, P, 1934
 Jesse Flores, P, 1943–47
 Jose Flores, IF, 2002
 Ron Flores, P, 2005–07
 Stu Flythe, P, 1936
 Hank Foiles, C, 1960
 Wilmer Font, P, 2018
 Ray Fosse, C, 1973–75
 Keith Foulke, P, 2003, 2008
 Dick Fowler, P, 1941–52
 Dustin Fowler, OF, 2018
 Eric Fox, OF, 1992–94
 Jack Fox, OF, 1908
 Jake Fox, IF/OF/C, 2010
 Nellie Fox, IF, 1947–49
 Jimmie Foxx, IF, 1925–35
 Jeff Francis, P, 2014
 Tito Francona, OF, 1969–70
 Herman Franks, C, 1947–48
 Chick Fraser, P, 1901
 Harvey Freeman, P, 1921
 Mark Freeman, P, 1959
 Nate Freiman, IF, 2013–14
 Tony Freitas, P, 1932–33
 Pat French, OF, 1917
 Walter French, OF, 1923–29
 Marion Fricano, P, 1952–55
 Charlie Fritz, P, 1907
 Harry Fritz, IF, 1913
 Brian Fuentes, P, 2011–12
 Tito Fuentes, IF, 1978
 Ollie Fuhrman, C, 1922
 Sam Fuld, OF, 2014-15
 Dot Fulghum, IF, 1921
 Dave Fultz, OF, 1901–02
 J.J. Furmaniak, OF, 2007
 Mike Fyhrie, P, 2001–02

G

 Augie Galan, OF, 1949
 Sean Gallagher, P, 2008–09
 Mike Gallego, IF, 1985–91, 1995
 Chick Galloway, IF, 1919–27
 Bob Ganley, OF, 1909
 Ron Gant, OF, 2001, 2003
 Joe Gantenbein, IF, 1939–40
 Bob Garbark, C, 1944
 Aramis Garcia, C, 2021
 Dermis García, 1B, 2022-
 Nomar Garciaparra, IF/DH, 2009
 Rob Gardner, P, 1971, 1973
 Larry Gardner, IF, 1918
 Dustin Garneau, C, 2019
 Phil Garner, IF, 1973–76
 Adrian Garrett, DH, 1971–72
 Ford Garrison, OF, 1944–46
 Webster Garrison, IF, 1996
 Ned Garver, P, 1957–60
 Charlie Gassaway, P, 1945
 Brent Gates, IF, 1993–96
 Chad Gaudin, P, 2006–08, 2010
 Doc Gautreau, IF, 1925
 Cory Gearrin, P, 2018
 Bob Geary, P, 1918–19
 Phil Geier, OF, 1901
 Jim Gentile, IF, 1964–65
 Craig Gentry, OF, 2014-15
 Alex George, IF, 1955
 Greek George, C, 1945
 Steve Gerkin, P, 1945
 Esteban Germán, IF, 2002–04
 Jason Giambi, IF, 1995–2001, 2009
 Jeremy Giambi, OF, 2000–02
 Charlie Gibson, C, 1924
 Joe Giebel, C, 1913
 Paul Giel, P, 1961
 Dan Giese, P, 2009
 Bob Giggie, P, 1960, 1962
 Joe Ginsberg, C, 1956
 Keith Ginter, IF, 2005
 Tommy Giordano, IF, 1953
 Dave Giusti, P, 1977
 Tom Glass, P, 1925
 Ryan Glynn, P, 2005
 Graham Godfrey, P, 2011–12
 Jonny Gomes, OF, 2012–14
 Yan Gomes, C, 2021
 Carlos González, OF, 2008
 Édgar González, P, 2009
 Gio González, P, 2008–11
 Orlando González, IF, 1980
 Lee Gooch, OF, 1917
 Danny Goodwin, DH, 1982
 Tom Gorman, P, 1955–59
 Jim Gosger, OF, 1966–68
 Rich Gossage, P, 1992–93
 Daniel Gossett, P, 2017-18
 Billy Grabarkewitz, IF, 1975
 Jason Grabowski, OF, 2002–03
 Milt Graff, IF, 1957–58
 Mudcat Grant, P, 1970–71
 Kendall Graveman, P, 2015-18
 Jeff Gray, P, 2008–09
 Johnny Gray, P, 1954–55
 Sam Gray, P, 1924–27
 Sonny Gray, P, 2013–17
 Dick Green, IF, 1963–74
 Grant Green, IF, 2013
 Joe Green, PH, 1924
 Luke Gregerson, P, 2014
 Vean Gregg, P, 1918
 Bill Grevell, P, 1919
 Ben Grieve, OF, 1997–2000
 Lee Griffeth, P, 1946
 A. J. Griffin, P, 2012–13
 Ivy Griffin, IF, 1919–21
 Pug Griffin, IF, 1917
 Alfredo Griffin, IF, 1985–87
 Guido Grilli, P, 1966
 Bob Grim, P, 1958–59, 1962
 Oscar Grimes, IF, 1946
 Charlie Grimm, IF, 1916
 Justin Grimm, P, 2022
 Lew Groh, IF, 1919
 Buddy Groom, P, 1996–99
 Gabe Gross, OF, 2010
 Wayne Gross, IF, 1976–83, 1986
 Robbie Grossman, OF, 2019-20
 Johnny Groth, OF, 1956–57
 Lefty Grove, P, 1925–33
 Roy Grover, IF, 1916–19
 Al Grunwald, P, 1959
 Joe Grzenda, P, 1964–66
 Reymin Guduan, P, 2021
 Deolis Guerra, P, 2021
 Mike Guerra, C, 1947–50
 Mario Guerrero, IF, 1978–80
 José Guillén, OF, 2003
 Ben Guintini, OF, 1950
 Randy Gumpert, P, 1936–38
 Mark Guthrie, P, 2001
 Johnny Guzman, P, 1991–92

H

 Bruno Haas, P, 1915
 Moose Haas, P, 1986–87
 Mule Haas, OF, 1928–32, 1938
 Bump Hadley, P, 1941
 Kent Hadley, IF, 1958–59
 Bill Haeffner, C, 1915
 Jesse Hahn, P, 2015-17
 Scott Hairston, OF, 2009
 John Halama, P, 2003
 Sammy Hale, IF, 1923–29
 Raymond Haley, C, 1916–17
 Dick Hall, P, 1960
 Irv Hall, IF, 1943–46
 Brad Halsey, P, 2006
 Dave Hamilton, P, 1972–75, 1979–80
 Tom Hamilton (baseball), IF, 1952–53
 Ken Hamlin, IF, 1960
 Luke Hamlin, P, 1944
 Jason Hammel, P, 2014
 Chris Hammond, P, 2004
 Buddy Hancken, C, 1940
 Garry Hancock, OF, 1983–84
 Gene Handley, IF, 1946–47
 Vern Handrahan, P, 1964–66
 Larry Haney, C, 1969–76
 Jay Hankins, OF, 1961–63
 Preston Hanna, P, 1982
 Jack Hannahan, IF, 2007–09
 Jack Hannifin, IF, 1906
 Aaron Harang, P, 2002–03
 Rich Harden, P, 2003–08
 Dan Haren, P, 2005–07
 Tim Harikkala, P, 2005
 Mike Harkey, P, 1995
 Jack Harper, P, 1915
 Brian Harper, C, 1987, 1995
 Tommy Harper, OF, 1975
 Slim Harrell, P, 1912
 Ken Harrelson, IF, 1963–67
 Bill Harrington, P, 1953, 1955–56
 Bob Harris, P, 1942
 Bubba Harris, P, 1948–49, 1951
 Lum Harris, P, 1941–46
 Reggie Harris, P, 1990–91
 Spencer Harris, OF, 1930
 Tom Harrison, P, 1965
 Josh Harrison, 2B, 2021
 Slim Harriss, P, 1920–26
 Topsy Hartsel, OF, 1902–11
 Chad Harville, P, 1999, 2001, 2003–04
 Ron Hassey, C, 1988–90
 Joe Hassler, IF, 1928–29
 Gene Hasson, IF, 1937–38
 Bob Hasty, P, 1919–24
 Chris Hatcher, P, 2017-18
 Scott Hatteberg, IF, 2002–05
 Gary Haught, P, 1997
 Joe Hauser, IF, 1922–28
 Clem Hausmann, P, 1949
 Andy Hawkins, P, 1991
 Jack Hayden, OF, 1901
 Frankie Hayes, C, 1933–42, 1944–45
 Jimmy Haynes, P, 1997–99
 Ryon Healy, 1B, 2016-17
 Thomas Healy, IF, 1915–16
 Mike Heath, C, 1979–85
 Dave Heaverlo, P, 1978–79, 1981
 Don Heffner, IF, 1943
 Mike Hegan, IF, 1971–73
 Fred Heimach, P, 1920–26
 Gorman Heimueller, P, 1983–84
 Heinie Heitmuller, OF, 1909–10
 Woodie Held, IF, 1957–58
 Eric Helfand, C, 1993–95
 Scott Hemond, C, 1989–94
 Dave Henderson, OF, 1988–93
 Rickey Henderson, OF, 1979–84, 1989–95, 1998
 Steve Henderson, OF, 1985–87
 George Hendrick, OF, 1971–72
 Liam Hendricks, P, 2016-20
 Weldon Henley, P, 1903–05
 Ray Herbert, P, 1955–61
 Gil Heredia, P, 1998–2001
 Jeremy Hermida, OF, 2010
 Ramón Hernández, C, 1999–2003
 José Herrera, OF, 1995–96
 Troy Herriage, P, 1956
 Chris Herrmann, C, 2019
 Mike Hershberger, OF, 1965–69
 Whitey Herzog, OF, 1958–60
 George Hesselbacher, P, 1916
 Ed Heusser, P, 1940
 Johnnie Heving, C, 1931–32
 Jesse Hickman, P, 1965–66
 Brandon Hicks, IF, 2012
 Pinky Higgins, IF, 1930–36
 Charlie High, OF, 1919–20
 Erik Hiljus, P, 2000–02
 Cliff Hill, P, 1917
 Dave Hill, P, 1957
 Donnie Hill, IF, 1983–86
 Jess Hill, OF, 1937
 Rich Hill, P, 2016
 Shawn Hillegas, P, 1992–93
 Ed Hilley, IF, 1903
 A. J. Hinch, C, 1998–2000
 Billy Hitchcock, IF, 1950–52
 Danny Hoffman, OF, 1903–06
 Willie Hogan, OF, 1911
 Wally Holborow, P, 1948
 Matt Holliday, OF, 2009
 Jim Holmes, P, 1906
 Chick Holmes, P, 1918
 Jim Holt, OF, 1974–76
 Red Holt, IF, 1925
 Mike Holtz, P, 2002
 Ken Holtzman, P, 1972–75
 Mark Holzemer, P, 1998–99
 Rick Honeycutt, P, 1987–93, 1995
 Alex Hooks, IF, 1935
 Bob Hooper, P, 1950–52
 Leon Hooten, P, 1974
 Sam Hope, P, 1907
 Don Hopkins, DH, 1975–76
 Joe Horlen, P, 1972
 Vince Horsman, P, 1992–94
 Willie Horton, OF, 1978
 Tim Hosley, C, 1973–74, 1976–81
 Gene Host, P, 1957
 Byron Houck, P, 1912–14
 Frank House, C, 1958–59
 Ben Houser, IF, 1910
 Steve Hovley, OF, 1970–71
 Steve Howard, OF, 1990
 Jay Howell, P, 1985–87
 Dann Howitt, OF, 1989–92
 Dick Howser, IF, 1961–63
 Tex Hoyle, P, 1952
 Waite Hoyt, P, 1931
 Glenn Hubbard, IF, 1988–89
 Earl Huckleberry, P, 1935
 Dave Hudgens, IF, 1983
 Tim Hudson, P, 1999–2004
 Luke Hughes, IF, 2012
 Hank Hulvey, P, 1923
 Nick Hundley, C, 2019
 Catfish Hunter, P, 1965–74
 Billy Hunter, IF, 1957–58
 Carl Husta, IF, 1925
 Bert Husting, P, 1902
 Warren Huston, IF, 1937

I
 Brandon Inge, IF, 2012
 Cole Irvin, P, 2021-22
 Jason Isringhausen, P, 1999–2001
 Akinori Iwamura, IF, 2010

J

 Ray Jablonski, IF, 1959–60
 Conor Jackson, OF/IF, 2010–11
 Drew Jackson, OF, 2022
 Edwin Jackson, P, 2018
 Joe Jackson, OF, 1908–09
 Reggie Jackson, OF, 1967–75, 1987
 Zach Jackson, P, 2022 
 Spook Jacobs, IF, 1954–56
 Baby Doll Jacobson, OF, 1927
 Brook Jacoby, IF, 1991
 John Jaha, IF, 1999–2001
 Justin James, P, 2010
 Charlie Jamieson, OF, 1917–18
 Kevin Jarvis, P, 1999
 John Jaso, C, 2013–14
 Stan Javier, OF, 1986–90, 1994–95
 Daulton Jefferies, P, 2020-
 Tom Jenkins, OF, 1926
 Doug Jennings, OF, 1988–91
 Robin Jennings, OF, 2001
 Willie Jensen, P, 1914
 D'Angelo Jiménez, IF, 2006
 Dany Jiménez, P, 2022-
 Manny Jiménez, OF, 1962–66
 Miguel Jimenez, P, 1993–94
 Tommy John, P, 1985
 Doug Johns, P, 1995–96, 2000
 Bill Johnson, OF, 1916–17
 Bob Johnson, OF, 1933–42
 Bob Johnson, IF, 1960, 1969–70
 Cliff Johnson, DH, 1981–82
 Dan Johnson, IF, 2005–08
 Dane Johnson, P, 1997
 Ellis Johnson, P, 1917
 Deron Johnson, IF, 1961–62, 1973–74
 Hank Johnson, P, 1936
 Jim Johnson, P 2014
 Jing Johnson, P, 1916–17, 1919, 1927–28
 John Henry Johnson, P, 1978–79
 Ken Johnson, P, 1958–61
 Mark Johnson, C, 2003
 Paul Johnson, OF, 1920–21
 Rankin Johnson, P, 1941
 Roy Johnson, P, 1918
 Stan Johnson, OF, 1961
 Doc Johnston, IF, 1922
 Jay Johnstone, OF, 1973
 John Johnstone, P, 1997
 Doug Jones, P, 1999–2000
 Jeff Jones, P, 1980–84
 John Jones, OF, 1923–32
 Gordon Jones, P, 1962
 Marcus Jones, P, 2000
 Eddie Joost, IF, 1947–54
 Mike Jorgensen, IF, 1977
 Félix José, OF, 1988–90
 Corban Joseph, 2B, 2019
 Rick Joseph, IF, 1964
 Bob Joyce, P, 1939
 Dick Joyce, P, 1965
 Matt Joyce, OF, 2017-18
 Ed Jurak, IF, 1988
 David Justice, OF, 2002

K

 Kila Ka'aihue, IF, 2012
 Jeff Kaiser, P, 1985
 Bill Kalfass, P, 1937
 James Kaprielian, P, 2020-
 Eric Karros, IF, 2004
 Steve Karsay, P, 1993–94, 1997, 2006
 Scott Kazmir, P, 2014-15
 Bob Kearney, C, 1981–83
 Teddy Kearns, IF, 1920
 Dave Keefe, P, 1917–21
 Ed Keegan, P, 1961
 Vic Keen, P, 1918
 Jim Keesey, IF, 1925–30
 Randy Keisler, P, 2006
 Skeeter Kell, IF, 1952
 George Kell, IF, 1943–46
 Al Kellett, P, 1923
 Harry Kelley, P, 1936–38
 Shawn Kelley, P, 2018
 Alex Kellner, P, 1948–58
 Walt Kellner, P, 1952–53
 Al Kellogg, P, 1908
 Bill Kelly, IF, 1920
 Ren Kelly, P, 1923
 Tony Kemp, 2B, 2020- 
 Jason Kendall, C, 2005–07
 Ed Kenna, P, 1902
 Adam Kennedy, IF, 2009
 Joe Kennedy, P, 2005–07
 Matt Keough, P, 1977–83
 Joe Keough, OF, 1968
 Gus Keriazakos, P, 1955
 Bill Kern, OF, 1962
 Fred Ketcham, OF, 1901
 Gus Ketchum, P, 1922
 Steve Kiefer, IF, 1984–85
 Bobby Kielty, OF, 2004–07
 Dean Kiekhefer, P, 2018
 Leo Kiely, P, 1960
 Mark Kiger, IF, 2006
 Brad Kilby, P, 2009–10
 Mike Kilkenny, P, 1972
 Evans Killeen, P, 1959
 Lee King, OF, 1916
 Mike Kingery, OF, 1992
 Brian Kingman, P, 1979–82
 Dave Kingman, OF, 1984–86
 Dennis Kinney, P, 1982
 Walt Kinney, P, 1919–23
 Mike Kircher, P, 1919
 Bill Kirk, P, 1961
 Tom Kirk, PH, 1947
 Ernie Kish, OF, 1945
 Lou Klein, IF, 1951
 Ed Klieman, P, 1950
 Lou Klimchock, IF, 1958–61
 Ron Klimkowski, P, 1971
 Bob Kline, P, 1934
 Joe Klink, P, 1990–91
 Mickey Klutts, IF, 1979–82
 Lou Knerr, P, 1945–46
 Austin Knickerbocker, OF, 1947
 Bill Knickerbocker, IF, 1942
 John Knight, IF, 1905–07
 Jack Knott, P, 1941–46
 Darold Knowles, P, 1971–74
 Tom Knowlson, P, 1915
 Bill Knowlton, P, 1920
 Billy Koch, P, 2002
 Jared Koenig, P, 2022
 Adam Kolarek, P, 2021-
 Don Kolloway, IF, 1953
 Shane Komine, P, 2006–07
 Brad Komminsk, OF, 1991
 Bruce Konopka, IF, 1942–46
 Graham Koonce, IF, 2003
 Larry Kopf, IF, 1914–15
 Merlin Kopp, OF, 1918–19
 Mark Kotsay, OF, 2004–07
 George Kottaras, C, 2012
 Kevin Kouzmanoff, IF, 2010–11
 Pete Kozma, SS, 2021
 Harry Krause, P, 1908–12
 Lew Krausse, P, 1931–32
 Lew Krausse Jr., P, 1961–69
 Danny Kravitz, C, 1960
 Mike Kreevich, OF, 1942
 Lou Kretlow, P, 1956
 Bill Krueger, P, 1983–86
 Bill Krueger, P, 1987
 Dick Kryhoski, IF, 1955
 Ted Kubiak, IF, 1967–69, 1972–75
 Tim Kubinski, P, 1997, 1999
 Johnny Kucab, P, 1950–52
 Johnny Kucks, P, 1959–60
 Bert Kuczynski, P, 1943
 John Kull, P, 1909
 Mike Kume, P, 1955
 Bill Kunkel, P, 1961–62
 Marty Kutyna, P, 1959–60

L

 Tony La Russa, IF, 1963, 1968–71
 Tommy La Stella, 2B, 2020
 Chet Laabs, OF, 1947
 Bob Lacey, P, 1977–80
 Marcel Lachemann, P, 1969–71
 Rene Lachemann, C, 1965–66, 1968
 William Lackey, P, 1890
 Tyler Ladendorf, 2B, 2015-16
 Ed Lagger, P, 1934
 Nap Lajoie, IF, 1901–02, 1915–16
 Jake Lamb, 3B, 2020
 Andrew Lambo, OF, 2016
 Bill Lamar, OF, 1924–27
 Ryan LaMarre, OF, 2017
 Dennis Lamp, P, 1987
 Bill Landis, P, 1963
 Jim Landis, OF, 1965
 Ryan Langerhans, OF, 2007
 Shea Langeliers, C, 2022-
 Rick Langford, P, 1977–86
 Red Lanning, OF, 1916
 Carney Lansford, IF, 1983–92
 Jack Lapp, C, 1908–15
 Jeff Larish, IF/OF, 2010
 Ed Larkin, C, 1909
 Andy LaRoche, IF, 2011
 Don Larsen, P, 1960–61
 Tommy Lasorda, P, 1956
 Charley Lau, C, 1963–64
 Billy Lauder, IF, 1901
 Ramón Laureano, OF, 2018-
 George Lauzerique, P, 1967–69
 Doc Lavan, IF, 1913
 Ryan Lavarnway, C, 2017
 Gary Lavelle, P, 1987
 Vance Law, IF, 1991
 Brett Lawrie, 3B, 2015
 Otis Lawry, IF, 1916–17
 Brett Laxton, P, 1999–2000
 Tom Leahy, C, 1901
 Fred Lear, IF, 1915
 Bevo LeBourveau, OF, 1929
 Paul Lehner, OF, 1950–51
 Justin Lehr, P, 2004
 Dave Leiper, P, 1984–87, 1994–95
 Dummy Leitner, P, 1901
 Johnnie LeMaster, IF, 1987
 Jacob Lemoine, P, 2022-
 Patrick Lennon, OF, 1996–97
 Ed Lennox, IF, 1906
 Arnold Leon, P, 2015
 Elmer Leonard, P, 1911
 John Leovich, C, 1941
 Brian Lesher, OF, 1996–98
 Jon Lester, P, 2014
 Allan Lewis, OF, 1967–73
 Colby Lewis, P, 2007
 Darren Lewis, OF, 1990
 Richie Lewis, P, 1997
 Cory Lidle, P, 2001–02
 Dutch Lieber, P, 1935–36
 Glenn Liebhardt, P, 1930
 Bill Lillard, IF, 1939–40
 Ted Lilly, P, 2002–03
 Lou Limmer, IF, 1951–54
 Paul Lindblad, P, 1965–71, 1973–76
 Josh Lindblom, P, 2014
 Bob Lindemann, OF, 1901
 Axel Lindstrom, P, 1916
 Larry Lintz, IF, 1976–77
 Hod Lisenbee, P, 1936
 Jack Littrell, IF, 1952–55
 Paddy Livingston, C, 1909–11
 Esteban Loaiza, P, 2006–07
 Harry Lochhead, IF, 1901
 Bob Locker, P, 1970–72
 Skip Lockwood, P, 1965
 Dario Lodigiani, IF, 1938–40
 Zach Logue, P, 2022-
 Lep Long, P, 1911
 Terrence Long, OF, 1999–2003
 Pete Loos, P, 1901
 Christian Lopes, OF, 2022-
 Davey Lopes, IF, 1982–84
 Héctor López, OF, 1955–59
 Bris Lord, OF, 1905–07, 1910–12
 Andrew Lorraine, P, 1997
 Pete Lovrich, P, 1963
 Jed Lowrie, IF, 2013–14, 2016-18, 2021-22
 Sam Lowry, P, 1942–43
 Hal Luby, IF, 1936
 Josh Lucas, P, 2018
 Jonathan Lucroy, C, 2018
 Eric Ludwick, P, 1997
 Larry Luebbers, P, 2002
 Ruddy Lugo, P, 2007
 Jerry Lumpe, IF, 1959–63
 Jesús Luzardo, P, 2019-21
 Scott Lydy, OF, 1993
 Rick Lysander, P, 1980

M

 Duke Maas, P, 1958
 John Mabry, OF, 2002
 Mike Macfarlane, C, 1998–99
 Vimael Machín, 3B, 2020-22
 Earle Mack, IF, 1910–14
 Shane Mack, OF, 1998
 Eric Mackenzie, C, 1955
 Gordon Mackenzie, C, 1961
 Felix Mackiewicz, OF, 1941–43
 David MacKinnon, 1B, 2022-
 John Mackinson, P, 1953
 Ed Madjeski, C, 1932–34
 Ryan Madson, P, 2016-17
 Dave Magadan, IF, 1997–98
 Harl Maggert, OF, 1912
 Mike Magnante, P, 2000–02
 Trystan Magnuson, P, 2011
 Roy Mahaffey, P, 1930–35
 Ron Mahay, P, 1999–2000
 Al Mahon, P, 1930
 Emil Mailho, OF, 1936
 Jim Mains, P, 1943
 Hank Majeski, IF, 1946–49, 1951–52
 Ben Mallonee, OF, 1921
 Sheldon Mallory, OF, 1977
 Lew Malone, IF, 1915–16
 Sean Manaea, P, 2016-21
 Ángel Mangual, OF, 1971–76
 Fred Manrique, IF, 1991
 Frank Manush, IF, 1908
 Phil Marchildon, P, 1940–49
 Johnny Marcum, P, 1933–35
 Roger Maris, OF, 1958–59
 Parker Markel, P, 2022
 Gene Markland, IF, 1950
 Gonzalo Márquez, IF, 1972–73
 Jay Marshall, P, 2007, 2009
 Starling Marte, OF, 2021
 Billy Martin, IF, 1957
 Cody Martin, P, 2015
 Doc Martin, P, 1908–12
 Morrie Martin, P, 1951–54
 Pat Martin, P, 1919–20
 Adrian Martinez, P, 2022-
 Hector Martinez, OF, 1962–63
 Marty Martínez, IF, 1972
 Ted Martínez, IF, 1975
 Nick Martini, OF, 2018-19
 Wedo Martini, P, 1935
 Bob Martyn, OF, 1957–59
 Damon Mashore, OF, 1996–97
 Walt Masters, P, 1939
 Len Matarazzo, P, 1952
 Joe Mathes, IF, 1912
 Nelson Mathews, OF, 1964–65
 T. J. Mathews, P, 1997–2001
 Francisco Matos, IF, 1994
 Hideki Matsui, DH, 2011–
 Wid Matthews, OF, 1923
 Cloy Mattox, C, 1929
 Harry Matuzak, P, 1934–36
 Carmen Mauro, OF, 1953
 Dal Maxvill, IF, 1972–75
 Bert Maxwell, P, 1908
 Bruce Maxwell, C, 2016-18
 Brent Mayne, C, 1997
 Eddie Mayo, IF, 1943
 Vin Mazzaro, P, 2009–10
 Wickey McAvoy, C, 1913–19
 Matt McBride, C, 2016
 Bill McCahan, P, 1946–49
 Emmett McCann, IF, 1920–21
 Brandon McCarthy, P, 2011–12
 David McCarty, IF, 2003
 Steve McCatty, P, 1977–85
 Sam McConnell, IF, 1915
 Barney McCosky, OF, 1946–51
 Willie McCovey, IF, 1976
 Benny McCoy, IF, 1940–41
 Les McCrabb, P, 1939–50
 Frank McCue, IF, 1922
 Mickey McDermott, P, 1957, 1961
 Danny McDevitt, P, 1962
 Hank McDonald, P, 1931–33
 Jason McDonald, OF, 1997–2000
 Mickey McDonald, OF, 2022-
 Lee McElwee, IF, 1916
 TJ McFarland, P, 2020
 Willie McGee, OF, 1990
 Connie McGeehan, P, 1903
 Bill McGhee, IF, 1944–45
 Ed McGhee, OF, 1953–54
 John McGillen, P, 1944
 Beauty McGowan, OF, 1922–23
 Mark McGwire, IF, 1986–97
 Stuffy McInnis, IF, 1909–17
 Matty McIntyre, OF, 1901
 Cody McKay, C, 2002
 Dave McKay, IF, 1980–82
 David McKay, P, 2022
 Tim McKeithan, P, 1932–34
 Bob McKinney, IF, 1901
 Billy McKinney, OF, 2022
 Rich McKinney, IF, 1973–77
 Denny McLain, P, 1972
 Bo McLaughlin, P, 1981–82
 Pat McLaughlin, P, 1940
 Mark McLemore, IF, 2004
 Jack McMahan, P, 1956
 Jim McManus, IF, 1960
 Greg McMichael, P, 1999–2000
 Billy McMillon, OF, 2001, 2003–04
 Ken McMullen, IF, 1976
 Eric McNair, IF, 1929–35, 1942
 Bob McNamara, IF, 1939
 Rusty McNealy, DH, 1983
 Bill McNulty, OF, 1969–72
 John McPherson, P, 1901
 Jerry McQuaig, OF, 1934
 George McQuinn, IF, 1946
 Jim Mecir, P, 2000–04
 Doc Medich, P, 1977
 Bill Meehan, P, 1915
 Roy Meeker, P, 1923–24
 Adam Melhuse, C, 2003–06
 Kevin Melillo, IF, 2007
 Joe Mellana, IF, 1927
 Jon Meloan, P, 2009
 Dave Melton, OF, 1956–58
 Frank Menechino, IF, 1999–2004
 Daniel Mengden, P, 2016-20
 Orlando Mercado, C, 1988
 Henry Mercedes, C, 1992–93
 Charlie Metro, OF, 1944–45
 Alex Metzler, OF, 1926
 Bob Meyer, P, 1964
 Billy Meyer, C, 1916–17
 Dan Meyer, IF, 1982–85
 Dan Meyer, P, 2006–07
 Russ Meyer, P, 1959
 Scott Meyer, C, 1978
 Cass Michaels, IF, 1952–53
 Carl Miles, P, 1940
 Dee Miles, OF, 1939–42
 Bing Miller, OF, 1922–26, 1928–34
 Damian Miller, C, 2004
 Jai Miller, OF, 2011
 Jim Miller, P, 2012
 Rudy Miller, IF, 1929
 Billy Milligan, P, 1901
 Bill Mills, C, 1944
 Brad Mills, P, 2014, 2015
 Tommy Milone, P, 2012–14
 Don Mincher, IF, 1970–72
 Ray Miner, P, 1921
 Craig Minetto, P, 1978–81
 Mike Minor, P, 2020
 Craig Mitchell, P, 1975–77
 Fred Mitchell, P, 1902
 Kevin Mitchell, OF, 1998
 Paul Mitchell, P, 1976–77
 Ralph Mitterling, OF, 1916
 Mike Mohler, P, 1993–98
 Izzy Molina, C, 1996–98
 Sam Moll, P, 2017, 2021- 
 Rinty Monahan, P, 1953
 Rick Monday, OF, 1966–71
 Nate Mondou, 2B, 2022-
 Frankie Montas, P, 2017-22
 Aurelio Monteagudo, P, 1963–66
 Steve Montgomery, P, 1996–97
 Luke Montz, C, 2013
 Bill Mooneyham, P, 1986
 Jimmy Moore, OF, 1930–31
 Kelvin Moore, IF, 1981–83
 Kerwin Moore, OF, 1996
 Ferdie Moore, IF, 1914
 Mike Moore, P, 1989–92
 Roy Moore, P, 1920–22
 José Morales, DH, 1973
 Kendrys Morales, 1B/DH/P, 2019
 Herbie Moran, OF, 1908
 Mitch Moreland, 1B/DH, 2021
 Dave Morey, P, 1913
 Cy Morgan, P, 1909–12
 Joe Morgan, IF, 1984
 Joe Morgan, IF, 1959
 Mike Morgan, P, 1978–79
 Tom Morgan, P, 1957
 Doyt Morris, OF, 1937
 Bill Morrisette, P, 1915–16
 Bud Morse, IF, 1929
 Clay Mortensen, P, 2009–10
 Wally Moses, OF, 1935–41, 1949–51
 Walter Moser, P, 1906
 Guillermo Moscoso, P, 2011
 Brandon Moss, IF/OF, 2012–14
 Charlie Moss, C, 1934–36
 Don Mossi, P, 1965
 Edward Mujica, P, 2015
 Mark Mulder, P, 2000–04
 Jim Mullen, IF, 1904
 Jake Munch, OF, 1918
 Max Muncy, 1B, 2015-16
 Eric Munson, C, 2009
 Pedro Muñoz, OF, 1996
 Steve Mura, P, 1985
 Danny Murphy, IF, 1902–13
 Donnie Murphy, IF, 2007–08
 Dwayne Murphy, OF, 1978–87
 Eddie Murphy, OF, 1912–15
 Mike Murphy, C, 1916
 Morgan Murphy, C, 1901
 Sean Murphy, C, 2019-22
 Joe Murray, P, 1950
 Larry Murray, OF, 1977–79
 Ray Murray, C, 1951–53
 Matt Murton, OF, 2008
 Glenn Myatt, C, 1920–21
 Elmer Myers, P, 1915–18
 Greg Myers, C, 2001–02
 Joseph Myers, P, 1905

N

 Jack Nabors, P, 1915–17
 Bill Nagel, IF, 1939
 Pete Naktenis, P, 1936
 Jim Nash, P, 1966–69
 Rollie Naylor, P, 1917–24
 Zach Neal, 2016-17
 Troy Neel, DH, 1992–94
 Mike Neill, OF, 1998–99
 Gene Nelson, P, 1987–92
 Lynn Nelson, P, 1937–39
 Rob Nelson, IF, 1986–87
 Pat Neshek, P, 2012–13
 Jim Nettles, OF, 1981
 Mike Neu, P, 2003
 Sheldon Neuse, IF, 2019, 2022-
 Jeff Newman, C, 1976–82
 Bobo Newsom, P, 1944–46, 1952–53
 Skeeter Newsome, IF, 1935–39
 Simon Nicholls, IF, 1906–09
 Bill Nicholson, OF, 1936
 Al Niemiec, IF, 1936
 Junior Noboa, IF, 1994
 Sean Nolin, P, 2015
 Pete Noonan, C, 1904
 Jordan Norberto, P, 2011–12
 Irv Noren, OF, 1957
 Fred Norman, P, 1962–63
 Derek Norris, C, 2012–14
 Mike Norris, P, 1975–90
 Billy North, OF, 1973–78
 Joe Nossek, OF, 1966–67, 1969
 Win Noyes, P, 1917, 1919
 Edwin Núñez, P, 1993–94
 Renato Núñez, OF, 2016-17
 Joe Nuxhall, P, 1961

O

 Charlie O'Brien, C, 1985
 John O'Donoghue, P, 1963–65
 Eric O'Flaherty, P, 2014-15
 Harry O'Neill, P, 1922–23
 Harry O'Neill, C, 1939
 Blue Moon Odom, P, 1964–75
 Curly Ogden, P, 1922–24
 Jim Oglesby, IF, 1936
 Hideki Okajima, P, 2013
 Rube Oldring, OF, 1906–18
 Omar Olivares, P, 1999–2001
 Adam Oller, P, 2022-
 Matt Olson, IF, 2016-21
 Steve Ontiveros, P, 1985–88, 1994–95
 Mike Oquist, P, 1997–99
 Nate Orf, SS, 2020
 Billy Orr, IF, 1913–14
 José Ortiz, IF, 2000–01
 Roberto Ortiz, OF, 1950
 Ossie Orwoll, P, 1928–29
 Dan Osinski, P, 1962
 Darrell Osteen, P, 1970
 Bill Oster, P, 1954
 Dan Otero, P, 2013–15
 Dave Otto, P, 1987–90
 Josh Outman, P, 2008–09, 2011
 Dillon Overton, P, 2016
 Bob Owchinko, P, 1981–82
 Jack Owens, C, 1935
 Doc Ozmer, P, 1923

P

 Cristian Pache, OF, 2022-
 Emilio Pagán, P, 2018
 Mitchell Page, DH, 1977–83
 Sam Page, P, 1939
 Jim Pagliaroni, C, 1968–69
 Satchel Paige, P, 1965
 Eddie Palmer, IF, 1917
 Joe Palmisano, C, 1931
 Jim Panther, P, 1971
 Craig Paquette, IF, 1993–95
 Tony Parisse, C, 1943–44
 Ace Parker, IF, 1937–38
 Dave Parker, OF, 1988–89
 Jarrod Parker, P, 2012–13
 Roy Parmelee, P, 1939
 Rube Parnham, P, 1916–17
 Jeff Parrett, P, 1992
 Andy Parrino, IF, 2013–15
 Bill Parsons, P, 1974
 Joe Pate, P, 1926–27
 Daryl Patterson, P, 1971
 Eric Patterson, OF/IF, 2008–10
 Mike Patterson, OF, 1981
 Bill Patton, C, 1935
 Joel Payamps, P, 2022
 Jay Payton, OF, 2005–06
 Hal Peck, OF, 1944–46
 Jack Peerson, IF, 1935–36
 Carlos Peña, IF, 2002
 Orlando Peña, P, 1962–65
 Roberto Peña, IF, 1970
 Cliff Pennington, IF, 2008–12
 Herb Pennock, P, 1912–15
 Bob Pepper, P, 1915
 Antonio Pérez, IF, 2006
 Marty Perez, IF, 1977–78
 Charlie Perkins, P, 1930
 Cy Perkins, C, 1915–30
 Jim Perry, P, 1975
 Scott Perry, P, 1918–21
 Rick Peters, OF, 1983–86
 Rusty Peters, IF, 1936–38
 Jim Peterson, P, 1931–33
 Shane Peterson, 1B, 2013
 Gregorio Petit, 2B, 2008–09
 Yusmeiro Petit, P, 2018-21
 Monte Pfeffer, IF, 1913
 Dan Pfister, P, 1961–64
 Josh Phegley, C, 2015-19
 Ken Phelps, DH, 1989–90
 Dave Philley, OF, 1951–53
 Tony Phillips, OF, 1982–89, 1999
 Steve Phoenix, P, 1994–95
 Adam Piatt, OF, 2000–03
 Wiley Piatt, P, 1901
 Mike Piazza, DH, 2007
 Rob Picciolo, SS, 1977–82, 1985
 Val Picinich, C, 1916–17
 Charlie Pick, 3B, 1916
 Ollie Pickering, CF, 1903–04
 Tony Pierce, P, 1967–68
 William Pierson, P, 1918–19, 1924
 Joe Pignatano, C, 1961
 Al Pilarcik, OF, 1956, 1961
 Squiz Pillion, P, 1915
 Horacio Piña, P, 1973
 Chad Pinder, UT, 2016-22
 Ed Pinnance, P, 1903
 Cotton Pippen, P, 1939
 Stephen Piscotty, OF, 2019-22
 Jim Pisoni, OF, 1956–57
 Gaylen Pitts, 3B, 1974–75
 Juan Pizarro, P, 1969
 Eddie Plank, P, 1901–14
 Phil Plantier, LF, 1996
 Don Plarski, CF, 1955
 Rance Pless, 1B, 1956
 Trevor Plouffe, 3B, 2017
 Eric Plunk, P, 1986–89
 Luis Polonia, LF, 1987–89
 Drew Pomeranz, P, 2014-15
 Jim Poole, IF, 1925–27
 Ray Poole, PH, 1941, 1947
 Bo Porter, OF, 2000
 Odie Porter, P, 1902
 Arnie Portocarrero, P, 1954–57
 Leo Posada, OF, 1960–62
 Nels Potter, P, 1938–41, 1948
 Boog Powell, OF, 2017-18
 Landon Powell, C, 2009–11
 Vic Power, 1B, 1954–58
 Doc Powers, C, 1901–09
 Ike Powers, P, 1927–28
 Bobby Prescott, LF, 1961
 Jason Pridie, OF, 2015
 Ariel Prieto, P, 1995–98, 2000
 Jurickson Profar, 2B, 2019
 Jim Pruett, C, 1944–45
 Austin Pruitt, P, 2022
 George Puccinelli, RF, 1936
 A.J. Puk, P, 2019, 2021-22
 Nick Punto, IF/OF, 2014
 David Purcey, P, 2011
 Danny Putnam, OF, 2007

Q

 Jack Quinn, P, 1925–30
 Tad Quinn, P, 1902–03
 Luis Quiñones, IF, 1983
 Jamie Quirk, C, 1989–92

R

 Mike Raczka, P, 1992
 Hal Raether, P, 1954, 1957
 Tim Raines, OF, 1999
 Chuck Rainey, P, 1984
 Ed Rakow, P, 1961–63
 Edwar Ramírez, P, 2010
 Carlos Ramirez, P, 2018
 Milt Ramírez, IF, 1979
 Willie Randolph, IF, 1990
 Vic Raschi, P, 1955
 Morrie Rath, IF, 1909–10
 Jon Ratliff, P, 2000
 Carl Ray, P, 1915–16
 Randy Ready, IF, 1992
 Britt Reames, P, 2005
 Anthony Recker, C, 2011–12
 Josh Reddick, OF, 2012–16
 Mark Redman, P, 2004
 Howie Reed, P, 1958–60
 Chad Reineke, P, 2009
 Al Reiss, IF, 1932
 Jim Reninger, P, 1938–39
 Steve Renko, P, 1978
 Bill Renna, OF, 1954–56
 Roger Repoz, OF, 1966–67
 Chris Resop, P, 2013
 Otto Rettig, P, 1922
 Todd Revenig, P, 1992
 Dave Revering, IF, 1978–81
 Carlos Reyes, P, 1994–97
 Tommie Reynolds, OF, 1963–65, 1969
 Arthur Rhodes, P, 2004
 Gordon Rhodes, P, 1936
 Paul Richards, C, 1935
 Jack Richardson, P, 1915–16
 Ken Richardson, IF, 1942
 Don Richmond, IF, 1941–47
 Harry Riconda, IF, 1923–24
 Brad Rigby, P, 1997–99
 Dave Righetti, P, 1994
 José Rijo, P, 1985–87
 Ernest Riles, IF, 1991
 Ricardo Rincón, P, 2002–05
 Bob Rinker, C, 1950
 Jimmy Ripple, OF, 1943
 Jim Rivera, OF, 1961
 Tanner Roark, P, 2019
 Bip Roberts, IF, 1998
 Ray Roberts, P, 1919
 Connor Robertson, P, 2007
 Jim Robertson, C, 1954–55
 Sherry Robertson, OF, 1952
 Bruce Robinson, C, 1978
 Eddie Robinson, IF, 1953, 1956
 Floyd Robinson, OF, 1968
 Ben Rochefort, IF, 1914
 Fernando Rodriguez, P, 2014-16
 Henry Rodríguez, P, 2009–10
 Rick Rodriguez, P, 1986–87
 Roberto Rodriquez, P, 1967, 1970
 Fernando Rodney, P, 2018-19
 Oscar Roettger, IF, 1932
 Tom Rogers, P, 1919
 Kenny Rogers, P, 1997–99
 Jim Roland, P, 1969–72
 Dutch Romberger, P, 1954
 Eddie Rommel, P, 1920–32
 Sergio Romo, P, 2021
 Matt Roney, P, 2006
 Phil Roof, C, 1966–69
 Adam Rosales, IF, 2010–13, 2017
 Buddy Rosar, C, 1945–49
 Santiago Rosario, IF, 1965
 Mike Rose, C, 2004
 Larry Rosenthal, OF, 1944–45
 Buck Ross, P, 1936–41
 Cody Ross, OF, 2015
 Tyson Ross, P, 2010–12
 Braggo Roth, OF, 1919
 Jack Rothrock, OF, 1937
 Mike Rouse, IF, 2006
 Harland Rowe, IF, 1916
 Chuck Rowland, C, 1923
 Emil Roy, P, 1933
 Dick Rozek, P, 1953–54
 Al Rubeling, IF, 1940–41
 Joe Rudi, OF, 1967–76, 1982
 Norge Ruiz, P, 2022-
 Joe Rullo, IF, 1943–44
 Jeff Russell, P, 1992
 Lefty Russell, P, 1910–12
 Mickey Rutner, IF, 1947
 Rob Ryan, OF, 2001
 Marc Rzepczynski, P, 2016

S

 Kirk Saarloos, P, 2004–06, 2008
 Olmedo Sáenz, IF, 1999–2002
 Tom Saffell, OF, 1955
 Johnny Sain, P, 1955
 Lenn Sakata, IF, 1986
 Roger Salmon, P, 1912
 Gus Salve, P, 1908
 Jeff Samardzija, P, 2014
 Ed Samcoff, IF, 1951
 Alejandro Sánchez, OF, 1987
 John Sanders, PH, 1965
 Ken Sanders, P, 1964, 1966, 1968
 Scott Sanderson, P, 1990
 Charlie Sands, DH, 1975
 Tommy Sandt, IF, 1975–76
 Jack Sanford, P, 1967
 Manny Sanguillén, C, 1977
 F. P. Santangelo, OF, 2001
 José Santiago, P, 1956
 José Santiago, P, 1963–65
 Scott Sauerbeck, P, 2006
 Rusty Saunders, OF, 1927
 Rich Sauveur, P, 1999–2000
 Bob Savage, P, 1942–48
 Joe Savery, P, 2014
 Steve Sax, IF, 1994
 Jeff Schaefer, IF, 1994
 Wally Schang, C, 1913–17, 1930
 Rube Schauer, P, 1917
 Heinie Scheer, IF, 1922–23
 Carl Scheib, P, 1943–54
 Jim Schelle, P, 1939
 Red Schillings, P, 1922
 Brian Schlitter, P, 2019
 Biff Schlitzer, P, 1908–09
 Ossee Schreckengost, C, 1902–08
 Steve Schrenk, P, 2000
 Hack Schumann, P, 1906
 Patrick Schuster, P, 2016
 Randy Schwartz, IF, 1965–66
 Frank Schwindel, 1B, 2021
 Jerry Schypinski, IF, 1955
 Dick Scott, IF, 1989
 Rodney Scott, IF, 1977
 Evan Scribner, P, 2012–15
 Marco Scutaro, IF, 2004–07
 JP Sears, P, 2022-
 Diego Seguí, P, 1962–65, 1967–68, 1970–72
 Socks Seibold, P, 1915–19
 Kevin Seitzer, IF, 1993
 Sam Selman, P, 2021-
 Marcus Semien, IF, 2015-2020
 Scott Service, P, 2000
 Jimmy Sexton, IF, 1981–82
 Socks Seybold, OF, 1901–08
 Art Shamsky, OF, 1972
 Bill Shanner, P, 1920
 Red Shannon, IF, 1917–21
 Billy Shantz, C, 1954–55
 Bobby Shantz, P, 1949–56
 Ralph Sharman, OF, 1917
 Shag Shaughnessy, OF, 1908
 Jeff Shaver, P, 1988
 Bob Shaw, P, 1961
 Don Shaw, P, 1972
 Bob Shawkey, P, 1913–15
 Red Shea, P, 1918
 Dave Shean, IF, 1906
 Tom Sheehan, P, 1915–16
 Ben Sheets, P, 2010
 Rollie Sheldon, P, 1965–66
 Scott Sheldon, IF, 1997
 Ed Sherling, PH,  1924
 Joe Sherman, P, 1915
 Tex Shirley, P, 1941–42
 Charlie Shoemaker, IF, 1961–64
 Bill Shores, P, 1928–31
 Eric Show, P, 1991
 Norm Siebern, IF, 1960–63
 Sonny Siebert, P, 1975
 Dick Siebert, IF, 1938–45
 Rubén Sierra, OF, 1992–95
 Frank Sigafoos, IF, 1926
 Al Sima, P, 1954
 Al Simmons, OF, 1924–32, 1940–41, 1944, HOF
 Harry Simpson, OF, 1955–59
 Matt Sinatro, C, 1987–88
 Chris Singleton, OF, 2003
 Scott Sizemore, IF, 2011–13
 Frank Skaff, IF, 1943
 Lou Skizas, OF, 1956–57
 John Slappey, P, 1920
 Enos Slaughter, OF, 1955–56
 Lou Sleater, P, 1955
 Joe Slusarski, P, 1991–93
 Aaron Small, P, 1996–98
 Jim Small, OF, 1958
 Burch Smith, P, 2021
 Chris Smith, P, 2016-17
 Dave Smith, P, 1938–39
 Eddie Smith, P, 1936–39
 Greg Smith, P, 2008
 Hal Smith, C, 1956–59
 Harry Smith, C, 1901
 Josh Smith, P, 2017
 Kevin Smith, 3B, 2022-
 Mark Smith, P, 1983
 Mayo Smith, OF, 1945
 Red Smith, IF, 1925
 Seth Smith, OF, 2012–13
 Syd Smith, C, 1908
 Roger Smithberg, P, 1993–94
 Jake Smolinski, OF, 2015-18
 Kirby Snead, P, 2022-
 Chris Snelling, OF, 2007
 Brian Snyder, P, 1989
 Bernie Snyder, IF, 1935
 Russ Snyder, OF, 1959–60
 Eric Sogard, IF, 2010–16
 Lary Sorensen, P, 1984
 Joakim Soria, P, 2019-20
 Elías Sosa, P, 1978
 Geovany Soto, C, 2014
 Mark Souza, P, 1980
 Steve Sparks, P, 2003
 Tris Speaker, OF, 1928
 Jim Spencer, IF, 1981–82
 Stan Sperry, IF, 1938
 Bob Spicer, P, 1955–56
 Scott Spiezio, IF, 1996–99
 Ed Sprague, P, 1968–69
 Ed Sprague, IF, 1998–99
 Russ Springer, P, 2009
 Bill Stafford, P, 1966–67
 Steve Staggs, IF, 1978
 Larry Stahl, OF, 1964–66
 Tuck Stainback, OF, 1946
 Matt Stairs, OF, 1996–2000
 Gerry Staley, P, 1961
 George Staller, OF, 1943
 Fred Stanley, IF, 1981–82
 Mike Stanley, C, 2000
 Farmer Steelman, C, 1901–02
 Blake Stein, P, 1998–99
 Irv Stein, P, 1932
 Terry Steinbach, C, 1986–96
 Bill Stellbauer, OF, 1916
 Gene Stephens, OF, 1961–62
 Cal Stevenson, OF 2022-
 Bill Stewart, OF, 1955
 Dave Stewart, P, 1986–92, 1995
 Shannon Stewart, OF, 2007
 Wes Stock, P, 1964–67
 Art Stokes, P, 1925
 Ron Stone, OF, 1966
 Todd Stottlemyre, P, 1995–96
 Dan Straily, P, 2012–14
 Paul Strand, OF, 1924
 Huston Street, P, 2005–08
 Amos Strunk, OF, 1908–17, 1919–20, 1924
 Tom Sturdivant, P, 1959, 1963–64
 Dean Sturgis, C, 1914
 Lena Styles, C, 1919–21
 Ken Suarez, C, 1966–67
 Pete Suder, IF, 1941–55
 Jim Sullivan, P, 1921–22
 Haywood Sullivan, C, 1961–63
 Homer Summa, OF, 1929–30
 Champ Summers, OF, 1974
 Eric Surkamp, P, 2016
 Don Sutton, P, 1985
 Larry Sutton, OF, 2002
 Kurt Suzuki, C, 2006–13
 Dale Sveum, IF, 1993
 Buck Sweeney, OF, 1914
 Mike Sweeney, DH, 2008
 Ryan Sweeney, OF, 2008–
 Bob Swift, C, 1942–43
 Nick Swisher, OF, 2004–07

T

 Jerry Tabb, IF, 1977–78
 John Taff, P, 1913
 Fred Talbot, P, 1965–66, 1969–70
 Tim Talton, C, 1966–67
 Jeff Tam, P, 1999–2002
 Danny Tartabull, OF, 1995
 Jose Tartabull, OF, 1962–66
 Arlas Taylor, P, 1921
 Beau Taylor, C, 2018-19
 Billy Taylor, P, 1994–99
 Harry Taylor, P, 1957
 Joe Taylor, OF, 1954
 Michael Taylor, OF, 2011–13
 Miguel Tejada, IF, 1997–2003
 Dave Telgheder, P, 1996–98
 Tom Tellmann, P, 1985
 Gene Tenace, C, 1969–76
 Ralph Terry, P, 1957–59, 1966
 Wayne Terwilliger, IF, 1959–60
 Mickey Tettleton, C, 1984–87
 Dave Thies, P, 1963
 Bud Thomas, P, 1937–39
 Charles Thomas, OF, 2005
 Cody Thomas, OF, 2022-
 Fred Thomas, IF, 1919–20
 Frank Thomas, DH, 2006, 2008
 Ira Thomas, C, 1909–15
 Kite Thomas, OF, 1952–53
 Gary Thomasson, OF, 1978
 Harry Thompson, P, 1919
 Kevin Thompson, OF, 2007
 Rich Thompson, P, 2012
 Shag Thompson, OF, 1914–16
 Tim Thompson, C, 1956–57
 Trayce Thompson, OF, 2018
 Buck Thrasher, OF, 1916–17
 Marv Throneberry, IF, 1960–61
 Rusty Tillman, OF, 1986
 Eric Tipton, OF, 1939–41
 Joe Tipton, C, 1950–52
 Pat Tobin, P, 1941
 Jim Todd, P, 1975–76, 1979
 Phil Todt, IF, 1931
 Steven Tolleson, IF, 2010
 Dick Tomanek, P, 1958–59
 Andy Tomberlin, OF, 1995
 Brett Tomko, P, 2009
 Ka'ai Tom, OF, 2021
 Ron Tompkins, P, 1965
 Rupe Toppin, P, 1962
 Pablo Torrealba, P, 1977
 Mike Torrez, P, 1976–77, 1984
 César Tovar, OF, 1975–76
 Blake Treinen, P, 2017-19
 Bob Trice, P, 1953–55
 Andrew Triggs, P, 2016-18
 Manny Trillo, IF, 1973–74
 Lou Trivino, P, 2018-
 Bob Trowbridge, P, 1960
 Virgil Trucks, P, 1957–58
 John Tsitouris, P, 1958–60
 George Turbeville, P, 1935–37
 Terry Turner, IF, 1919
 Tink Turner, P, 1915
 Bill Tuttle, OF, 1958–61
 Jim Tyack, OF, 1943
 Jim Tyrone, OF, 1977

U

 Jim Umbarger, P, 1977
 Tom Underwood, P, 1981–83
 Woody Upchurch, P, 1935–36
 Bill Upton, P, 1954
 Jack Urban, P, 1957–58

V

 César Valdez, P, 2017
 Mario Valdez, IF, 2000–01
 Danny Valencia, 3B, 2015-16
 Elmer Valo, OF, 1940–54, 1955–56
 Ozzie Van Brabant, P, 1954–55
 Todd Van Poppel, P, 1991, 1993–96
 Porter Vaughan, P, 1940–46
 Roy Vaughn, P, 1934
 Al Veach, P, 1935
 Jorge Velandia, IF, 1998–2000
 Randy Velarde, IF, 1999–2000, 2002
 Mike Venafro, P, 2002
 Pat Venditte, P, 2015
 Rube Vickers, P, 1907–09
 Ozzie Virgil, Sr., IF, 1961
 Luis Vizcaíno, P, 1999–2001
 Stephen Vogt, IF/OF, 2013–17, 2022
 Jack Voigt, OF, 1998
 Dave Von Ohlen, P, 1986–87
 Ed Vosberg, P, 1994
 Bill Voss, OF, 1972

W

 Rube Waddell, P, 1902–07
 Hal Wagner, C, 1937–44
 Mark Wagner, IF, 1984
 Neil Wagner, P, 2011
 Bobby Wahl, P, 2017
 Kermit Wahl, IF, 1950–51
 Rube Walberg, P, 1923–33
 Ken Waldichuk, P, 2022
 Frank Walker, OF, 1920–21
 Jerry Walker, P, 1961–62
 Johnny Walker, IF, 1919–21
 Tilly Walker, OF, 1918–23
 Todd Walker, IF, 2007
 Tom Walker, P, 1902
 Jack Wallaesa, IF, 1940–46
 Denny Walling, IF, 1975–76
 Joe Wallis, OF, 1978–79
 Jimmy Walsh, OF, 1912–16
 Bruce Walton, P, 1991–92
 Bill Wambsganss, IF, 1926
 Wei-Chung Wang, P, 2019
 Preston Ward, IF, 1958–59
 Mike Warren, P, 1983–85
 Rabbit Warstler, IF, 1934–36
 John Wasdin, P, 1995–96
 Claudell Washington, OF, 1974–76
 Herb Washington, DH, 1974–75
 Gary Waslewski, P, 1972
 Neal Watlington, C, 1953
 Matt Watson, OF, 2005, 2010
 Mule Watson, P, 1918–19
 Harry Weaver, P, 1915–16
 Skeeter Webb, IF, 1948
 Ray Webster, 1B, 1967–69, 1971
 Jemile Weeks, IF, 2011–13
 Jordan Weems, P, 2020-21
 Walt Weiss, IF, 1987–92
 Johnny Welaj, OF, 1943
 Bob Welch, P, 1988–94
 Frank Welch, OF, 1919–26
 Bob Wellman, OF, 1948–50
 Casper Wells, OF, 2013
 J.B. Wendelken, P, 2016-21
 Joey Wendle, 2B, 2016-17
 Don Wengert, P, 1995–97
 Billy Werber, IF, 1937–38
 Buzz Wetzel, P, 1927
 Lee Wheat, P, 1954–55
 Zack Wheat, OF, 1927
 Woody Wheaton, OF, 1943–44
 Don White, OF, 1948–49
 Jo-Jo White, OF, 1943–44
 Walt Whittaker, P, 1916
 Dave Wickersham, P, 1960–63
 Collin Wiles, P, 2022-
 Spider Wilhelm, IF, 1953
 Marc Wilkins, P, 2000
 Bobby Wilkins, IF, 1944–45
 Jerry Willard, C, 1986–87
 Al Williams, P, 1937–38
 Billy Williams, OF, 1975–76
 Dib Williams, IF, 1930–35
 Dick Williams, OF, 1959–60
 Don Williams, P, 1962
 Earl Williams, C, 1977
 George Williams, IF, 1964
 George Williams, C, 1995–97
 Mark Williams, OF, 1977
 Marsh Williams, P, 1916
 Josh Willingham, OF, 2011
 Dale Willis, P, 1963
 Lefty Willis, P, 1925–27
 Whitey Wilshere, P, 1934–36
 Bill Wilson, OF, 1954–55
 Highball Wilson, P, 1902
 Jack Wilson, P, 1934
 Jacob Wilson, 2B, 2021
 Jim Wilson, P, 1949
 Tom Wilson, C, 2001
 Willie Wilson, OF, 1991–92
 Snake Wiltse, P, 1901–02
 Gordie Windhorn, OF, 1962
 Jason Windsor, P, 2006
 Al Wingo, OF, 1919
 Ed Wingo, C, 1920
 Hank Winston, P, 1933
 Alan Wirth, P, 1978–80
 Jay Witasick, P, 1996–98, 2005–06
 Ron Witmeyer, IF, 1991
 Bobby Witt, P, 1992–94
 Whitey Witt, OF, 1916–21
 Steve Wojciechowski, P, 1995–97
 John Wojcik, OF, 1962–64
 Lefty Wolf, P, 1921
 Ross Wolf, P, 2010
 Chuck Wolfe, P, 1923
 Roger Wolff, P, 1941–43
 Dooley Womack, P, 1970
 Doc Wood, IF, 1923
 Jason Wood, IF, 1998
 Mike Wood, P, 2003
 Darrell Woodard, IF, 1978
 Gary Woods, OF, 1976
 Fred Worden, P, 1914
 Tim Worrell, P, 1998–99
 Rich Wortham, P, 1983
 Ed Wright, P, 1952
 Taffy Wright, OF, 1949
 Michael Wuertz, P, 2009–11
 John Wyatt, P, 1961–66, 1969
 Weldon Wyckoff, P, 1913–16
 Hank Wyse, P, 1950–51

Y

 Keiichi Yabu, P, 2005
 George Yankowski, C, 1942
 Rube Yarrison, P, 1922
 Carroll Yerkes, P, 1927–29
 Lefty York, P, 1919
 Rudy York, IF, 1948
 Elmer Yoter, IF, 1921
 Chris Young, OF, 2013
 Curt Young, P, 1983–91, 1993
 Ernie Young, OF, 1994–97
 Matt Young, P, 1989
 Ralph Young, IF, 1922
 Eddie Yount, OF, 1937

Z

 Tom Zachary, P, 1918
 Joe Zapustas, OF, 1933
 Gus Zernial, OF, 1951–57
 Brad Ziegler, P, 2008–11
 Jimmy Zinn, P, 1919
 Barry Zito, P, 2000–06, 2015
 Ben Zobrist, 2B, 2015
 Sam Zoldak, P, 1951–52

References
General

Specific

Roster
Major League Baseball all-time rosters